Joseph Nguyễn Tích Đức (22 February 1938 – 23 May 2011) was Roman Catholic bishop of the Diocese of Ban Mê Thuôt, Vietnam. Ordained to the priesthood in 1967, Đức became bishop in 1997 and resigned in 2007.

Notes

1938 births
2011 deaths
Place of birth missing
20th-century Roman Catholic bishops in Vietnam
21st-century Roman Catholic bishops in Vietnam